Expert Common Knowledge is a trivia text-based game released by Expert Software for MS-DOS in 1992. It was designed and written by Rosemary K. West. One to four players can play on a single computer.

Categories
The game has 10 categories, players are asked 20 questions from each one.

 Nature
 History
 Grab Bag
 Literature
 Geography
 Vocabulary
 Mathematics
 Music & Arts
 Science & Computers
 Entertainment and Sports

References

External links
Rosemary West's Site

1992 video games
DOS games
DOS-only games
Quiz video games
Quiz games
Video games developed in the United States